Alan Lindsay Fogg  (1924–2010) was an Australian public servant and diplomat.

References

1924 births
2010 deaths
Ambassadors of Australia to Peru
Ambassadors of Australia to Venezuela
High Commissioners of Australia to Kiribati
High Commissioners of Australia to Nauru
Ambassadors of Australia to Colombia
Australian Members of the Order of the British Empire